New Bridge is an extinct town in Lumpkin County, in the U.S. state of Georgia.

History
New Bridge was named for a nearby new bridge over the Chestatee River.

References

Geography of Lumpkin County, Georgia
Ghost towns in Georgia (U.S. state)